Solute carrier family 25 member 22 is a protein that in humans is encoded by the SLC25A22 gene. This gene encodes a mitochondrial glutamate carrier. Mutations in this gene are associated with early infantile epileptic encephalopathy. Expression of this gene is increased in colorectal tumor cells.

Structure 
The SLC25A22 gene is located on the p arm of chromosome 11 in position 15.5 and has 9 exons spanning 7,807 base pairs. The gene produces a 34.5 kDa protein composed of 323 amino acids. The encoded protein is a multi-pass transmembrane protein located in the mitochondrial inner membrane.

Function 
The protein encoded by SLC25A22 is involved in the transport of glutamate, cotransported with H+, across the inner mitochondrial membrane. Both SLC25A22 and SLC25A18 are mitochondrial glutamate/H+ symporters.

Clinical significance

Epileptic encephalopathy 
Mutations in the SLC25A22 gene cause early infantile epileptic encephalopathy 3 (EIEE3), a severe form of epilepsy characterized by frequent tonic seizures or spasms beginning in infancy with a specific EEG finding of suppression-burst patterns, characterized by high-voltage bursts alternating with almost flat suppression phases. Epileptic encephalopathy early infantile type 3 is characterized by a very early onset, erratic and fragmentary myoclonus, massive myoclonus, partial motor seizures and late tonic spasms. The prognosis is poor, with no effective treatment, and children with the condition either die within 1 to 2 years after birth or survive in a persistent vegetative state.

Migrating partial seizures in infancy, caused by a specific G110R mutation in the SLC25A22 gene, can be inherited.

Although expression of SLC25A22 is high in most tissues, expression is particularly strong in the developing brain, with regions of the brain involved in the genesis and control of myoclonic seizures specifically expressing SLC25A22 during human development.

Colorectal cancer 
SLC25A22 expression is increased in colorectal tumor tissues compared to matched nontumor colon tissues. Increased expression of the encoded protein was associated with decreased survival times in colorectal cancer patients. Knockdown of this gene in mutant colorectal cells decreased their migration, proliferation, and invasion.

Interactions 
The encoded protein interacts with SLC38A1, NDUFAF4, and 43 other proteins.

References

Further reading